The discography of Hodgy, an American hip hop recording artist, consists of one studio album, four mixtapes and three EPs.

Studio albums

Mixtapes

Extended plays

Singles

As lead artist

As featured artist

Guest appearances

Music videos

References

 
Discographies of American artists
Hip hop discographies